John Peter Costas (1923 in Wabash, Indiana – August 9, 2008) was an American electrical engineer. Costas invented, among other things, the Costas loop and Costas arrays.

Biography
Costas studied at Purdue University as an undergraduate. During World War II, he was involved in radar engineering, serving in the U.S. Navy as a radar officer. He was a graduate student at Massachusetts Institute of Technology (MIT), where he worked on interference filtering 
and linear systems coding.
While there, he worked with Norbert Wiener, R. M. Fano, J. B. Wiesner and Y. W. Lee. He worked for General Electric from 1951 until the early 1980s, and for Cogent Systems, Inc. He was retired since then, and died on August 9, 2008.

Work
Costas is probably best known for his 1950s invention of the Costas loop, a modified phase locked loop that recovers the "suppressed" carrier in many digital communications receivers. It had "a profound effect on modern digital communications"
In the 1960s, he helped solve the mystery concerning poor performance of sonar systems. He found that the rapidly time-varying channel made coherent processing inappropriate. His solution involved a kind of permutation array, now known as a Costas array, which has ideal properties for the problem.

Costas was made a fellow of the Institute of Electrical and Electronics Engineers (IEEE) in 1965 for "contributions to communications theory and techniques."

Publications 
Among Costas' most notable publications are the following,
 1984, "A Study of a Class of Detection Waveforms Having Nearly Ideal Range-Doppler Ambiguity Properties" in Proc. IEEE, vol. 72, no. 8, pp.996-1009, Aug. 1984.
 1975 "Medium constraints on sonar design and performance". Technical Report Class 1 Rep. R65EMH33, GE Co., 1965. a synopsis of this report appeared in the Eascon. Conv. Rec., 1975, pp. 68A—68L
 1966 "Project Medior – A medium-oriented approach to sonar signal processing". Lockheed Martin Marine Systems and Sensors, 1966.
 1956 "Synchronous Communications". In Proceedings of the IEEE, December 1956. Republished in same journal in Vol 90, no. 8, August 2002 as classic paper.

References

External links 
 – Open Problems in Costas Arrays, S. Rickard.

1923 births
2008 deaths
American electrical engineers
MIT School of Engineering alumni
People from Wabash, Indiana
Purdue University College of Engineering alumni
Fellow Members of the IEEE
General Electric people
Fellows of the American Association for the Advancement of Science
20th-century American engineers
20th-century American inventors